The Ingersoll Shale is a Late Cretaceous (Santonian) informal geological unit in eastern Alabama. Fourteen theropod feathers assigned to birds and possibly dromaeosaurids have been recovered from the unit.

Description 

References

Bibliography 
  

Upper Cretaceous Series of North America
Cretaceous Alabama
Santonian Stage
Shale formations of the United States
Sandstone formations of the United States
Tidal deposits
Lagerstätten
Fossiliferous stratigraphic units of North America
Paleontology in Alabama